Onkarnath Baranwal is a politician from Batiya, Bihar, in eastern India. He won election 2010 from Chakai constitute by Jharkhand Vikas Morcha party. He was born in 1970 in Bihar. His father name was Shri Yamuna Prasad Baranwal.

Also see
List of politicians from Bihar

References

1970 births
Living people
Bihari politicians
21st-century Indian politicians
Activists from Bihar
Jharkhand Vikas Morcha (Prajatantrik) politicians
People from Jamui district